This article lists all rugby league footballers who have played first-grade for the Newcastle Knights in the NRL Women's Premiership.

NOTES:
 Debut:
 Players are listed in the order of their debut game with the club.
 Players that debuted in the same game are added alphabetically.
 Appearances: Newcastle Knights games only, not a total of their career games.
 Previous Club: refers to the previous first-grade NRLW rugby league club the player played at and does not refer to any junior club, Rugby Union club or a rugby league club she was signed to but never played at.
 Current players are indicated in bold text for their Knights career years.
 The statistics in this table are correct as of the end of the 2022 NRL Women's season.

List of players

See also
 List of Newcastle Knights players

External links
Official Debut Numbers
Rugby League Project - List of Players
Rugby League Project - Newcastle Knights Women's Transfers & Debuts

 
Players
Lists of Australian rugby league players
National Rugby League lists
New South Wales-related lists